Welcome is a 2020 South Korean television series starring Kim Myung-soo, Shin Ye-eun, Seo Ji-hoon, Yoon Ye-joo and Kang Hoon. Based on the 2009–2010 Naver webtoon of the same name by Go A-ra, it aired on KBS2's Wednesdays and Thursdays at 22:00 (KST) time slot from March 25 to April 30, 2020.

During its run, Welcome recorded a lowest single-episode rating of 0.8%, beating the previous record lows set by previous KBS2 dramas Lovely Horribly (2018) and Manhole (2017) to become the lowest rated drama airing in a primetime slot on a free-to-air network in history. Welcome's average rating of 1.7% was also the worst, until MBC drama Oh My Ladylord broke the record with a slightly lower average figure of 1.6% a year later.

Synopsis
A graphic designer in her mid-twenties, Sol Ah harbours dreams of becoming a web-based comic author and has always had a love-hate relationship with cats.

But Sol Ah's life changes fast when she brings home a friendly feline. It turns out, however, that this is not any old cat. Named Hong Jo, he can take human form. Hong Jo becomes exceptionally fond of So Ah, and goes to great pains to hide his human identity from her. He soon proves that he will do anything that is required in order to stay near her. Will Hong Jo manage to keep his identity a secret?

And what could be in store for this remarkable feline-human duo as their relationship deepens?

Cast

Main
 Kim Myung-soo as Hong-jo
 Baegi as Hong-jo (cat form)
He is actually a cat, who dreams to be a human. He realises that he can only be turned into a human by Sol-Ah. He grew excessive fond of Sol-ah and can go to any measures to stay near her.
 Shin Ye-eun as Kim Sol-ah
She is a graphic designer who dreams to be a webtoon artist. She has a love-hate relationship against cats. Initially, she used to date Lee Jae-Sun. Later, she tries hard to protect the secret identity of Hong-jo.
 Seo Ji-hoon as Lee Jae-sun
He has a cat like personality but is allergic to cats. Jae-sun broke up with Sol-Ah and went in a relationship with Lee Ru-bi. He has somewhat a complicated relationship with his father. He is the first person to find out that Hong-jo is a cat who can turn into human from time to time.
 Yoon Ye-joo as Eun Ji-eun
She is a senior sunbaenim in Sol-Ah and Doo-sik's office. She is introverted and has a cat like personality.
 Kang Hoon as Go Doo-sik
He is a friend to Sol-Ah and Jae-sun. Doo sik has a puppy like personality. He always stays cheerful and happy. His family runs a restaurant. His mother often sends breakfast to Sol-Ah.

Supporting
 Ahn Nae-sang as Kim Soo-pyeong. He is the father of Kim Sol-Ah. He is a poet by profession.
 Jo Ryun as Bang Sil. The woman whom Sol-Ah's father likes and wishes to marry. 
 Kim Yeo-jin as Sung Hyun-ja. She is the mother of Go Doo-sik. She runs a restaurant.
 Jeon Bae-soo as Go Min-joong. He is the father of Go Doo-sik.
 Jeon Ye-seo as Park Sin-ja
 Yang Dae-hyuk as Cha Sang-kwon
 Han Ye-seul as Lee Hye-yeon
 Lee Yu-jin as Choi Da-som
  as Grandmother
 Choi Bae-young as Lee Ru-bi. She used to date Lee Jae-sun. But later, dumps him to marry someone else. She is the actual owner of the cat.
 Yeon Je-hyung as Bang Gook-bong. He is the son of Bang-sil, making him the step brother of Sol-ah. He loves traveling and writing.
 Song Min-jae as Das-sung
 Jo Hyuk-joon as Na Jin-won

Production
Early working title of the series is Man Who Bakes Bread. It was originally planned to air on cable channel tvN in the first half of 2019, and the lead roles were offered to Yook Sung-jae and Park Eun-bin, but both declined.

The first script reading took place in October 2019 at KBS Annex Broadcasting Station in Yeouido, South Korea.

Original soundtrack

Part 1

Part 2

Part 3

Part 4

Part 5

Part 6

Part 7

Part 8

Part 9

Part 10

Part 11

Part 12

Part 13

Ratings
In this table,  represent the lowest ratings and  represent the highest ratings.

Notes

References

External links
  
 
 
 

Korean Broadcasting System television dramas
2020 South Korean television series debuts
2020 South Korean television series endings
Korean-language television shows
South Korean fantasy television series
South Korean romantic comedy television series
Television shows based on South Korean webtoons